The Magic Candle is a role-playing video game designed by James Thomas and developed and published by Mindcraft in 1992. It is a sequel to The Magic Candle II: The Four and Forty from 1991.

Gameplay
The notepad and party movement mechanics are improved from the previous game.

Reception

Scorpia of Computer Gaming World gave a negative review and summarized: "Overall, in spite of the neat blight idea, Magic Candle III is a dull game. I had a hard time getting into it, and slogged on mainly to get it over with. We’ve all been here before and there isn't anything really new or exciting. The game is unnecessarily lengthened by the constant need for money, and, overall, one is left with the feeling of doing things by rote rather than going off a grand adventure. It is all very depressing and rather a shame, as the first Magic Candle held much promise for the future - promise that has yet to be realized."

References

External links

1992 video games
DOS games
DOS-only games
Mindcraft games
Role-playing video games
Single-player video games
Video game sequels
Video games developed in the United States